Arun Dravid (born 1943) is an Indian industrialist and classical singer of the Jaipur gharana. A gold medalist from IIT Bombay, he went on to complete a doctorate in chemical engineering from MIT. He then pursued a highly successful career in industry. As a musician, he was trained in childhood by Ustaad Abdul Majid Khan, and later on by Kishori Amonkar. He became a key disciple of Amonkar, and has continued to preserve and promote her music.

He played the role of the music guru Pandit Vinayak Pradhan in the 2020 film The Disciple.

References

Indian male singers
1943 births
Living people